Nagell may refer to:

Richard Case Nagell, former military officer who claimed to have had foreknowledge of the John F. Kennedy assassination
Trygve Nagell (1895–1988), Norwegian mathematician, known for his works on the Diophantine equations within number theory

See also
Tinius Nagell-Erichsen (1934–2007), Norwegian publisher, noted for his leadership of the Schibsted media conglomerate
Nagell–Lutz theorem, in mathematics
Ramanujan–Nagell equation, in mathematics